Born a Rebel is an album by German heavy metal band Rebellion, released in 2003.

Track listing
"Born a Rebel" (Lulis, Göttlich) – 4:02
"Adrenalin" (Lulis, Göttlich) – 3:39
"One for All" (Lulis, Göttlich) – 5:09
"World Is War" (Lulis, Göttlich) – 4:40
"Dragons Fly" (Lulis, Eilen, Göttlich) – 3:57
"Queen of Spades" (Lulis, Göttlich) – 5:23
"Iron Flames" (Lulis, Eilen, Göttlich) – 6:13
"Through the Fire" (Lulis, Göttlich, Seifert) – 5:34
"Devil's Child" (Lulis, Göttlich, Seifert) – 5:38
"Meet Your Demon" (Lulis, Black, Göttlich) – 3:34
"Power of Evil" (Lulis, Göttlich) – 5:10

Credits
 Michael Seifert — vocals
 Uwe Lulis — guitars
 Björn Eilen — guitars
 Tomi Göttlich — bass
 Randy Black — drums

2003 albums
Concept albums
Rebellion (band) albums
Drakkar Entertainment albums